Bartłomiej Sielewski (born August 9, 1984 in Płock) is a Polish former footballer who played as a centre-back.

Career

Club
From 2003 to 2007 he performed in Mazowsze Płock sports club. In 2007/2008 season he moved to Wisła Płock. In his first game, he played in Wisła Płock team against Motor Lublin on August 8, 2007 (1:2). In Wisła Płock he played in 49 meetings and he scored 3 goals, and had 11 penalty cards in the whole career. In Wisła Płock he was playing as number 5. In season 2008/2009 he played 2235 minutes in matches.

In June 2011, he returned to Wisła Płock on a two-year contract.

Awards
 VII place on the Polish Junior Championships with Wisła Płock (2002)

References

External links
 

1984 births
Living people
Polish footballers
Wisła Płock players
Piast Gliwice players
Ekstraklasa players
I liga players
Sportspeople from Płock
Association football midfielders